Ilia Sergeyevich Vlasov (born 3 August 1995) is a Russian volleyball player. He is part of the Russia men's national volleyball team. On club level, he plays for Dynamo Moscow.

Sporting achievements

Clubs
 CEV Cup
  2020/2021 – with Dynamo Moscow

 CEV Challenge Cup
  2015/2016 – with Fakel Novy Urengoy
  2016/2017 – with Fakel Novy Urengoy

 National championships
 2020/2021  Russian Cup, with Dynamo Moscow
 2020/2021  Russian Championship, with Dynamo Moscow
 2020/2021  Russian Super Cup, with Dynamo Moscow
 2021/2022  Russian Championship, with Dynamo Moscow
 2021/2022  Russian Super Cup, with Dynamo Moscow

Youth national team
 2013  CEV U19 European Championship
 2014  CEV U20 European Championship

Universiade
 2015  Summer Universiade

Individual awards
 2013: CEV U19 European Championship – Best Blocker

References

External links
 Player profile at CEV.eu
 Player profile at WorldofVolley.com
 Player profile at Volleybox.net

1995 births
Living people
Sportspeople from Bashkortostan
Russian men's volleyball players
European Games medalists in volleyball
European Games bronze medalists for Russia
Volleyball players at the 2015 European Games
Universiade medalists in volleyball
Universiade gold medalists for Russia
Medalists at the 2015 Summer Universiade